Irina Nikolayevna Bespalova (born May 31, 1981) is a female butterfly swimmer from Russia, who represented her native country at the 2008 Summer Olympics in Beijing, PR China.  She competed in the women's 100m butterfly and the women's 4 × 100 m medley at the 2012 Summer Olympics.

References

External links 
 

1981 births
Living people
Russian female swimmers
Russian female butterfly swimmers
Olympic swimmers of Russia
Swimmers at the 2008 Summer Olympics
Swimmers at the 2012 Summer Olympics
Universiade medalists in swimming
Universiade gold medalists for Russia
Universiade bronze medalists for Russia
Universiade silver medalists for Russia
Medalists at the 2001 Summer Universiade
Medalists at the 2003 Summer Universiade
Medalists at the 2005 Summer Universiade
Medalists at the 2007 Summer Universiade
Sportspeople from Arkhangelsk
20th-century Russian women
21st-century Russian women